The MC14500B Industrial Control Unit (ICU) is a CMOS one-bit microprocessor designed by Motorola for simple control applications in 1977.

Overview 
MC14500B (ICU) is well-suited to the implementation of ladder logic, and thus could be used to replace relay systems and programmable logic controllers, also intended for serial data manipulation. The processor supports 16 commands, operating at a frequency of 1 MHz. The MC14500B unit does not include a program counter (PC); instead, a clock signal drives a separate PC chip; therefore the size of supported memory is dependent on the implementation of that chip. It was still in production in 1995.

The ICU architecture is similar to that of the DEC PDP-14 computer.

Developers 
The ICU was conceived by Vern Gregory in the mid-1970s while working as an engineer in a marketing / applications group of Motorola Semiconductor Products Sector in Phoenix, Arizona, USA; Brian Dellande originated circuit and sub-routine designs, and co-wrote the manual; Ray DiSilvestro was the bench technician; Terry Malarkey provided management support.

In the CMOS Logic Division in Austin, Texas, USA (where it was made) Phil Smith was the chip designer; Mike Hadley provided product applications support.

Derivatives 
A form of the design served as an embedded controller in a custom automotive chip made for Nippon Denso by Motorola—Japan. 

I.P.R.S. Băneasa manufactured a clone of the MC14500B with the designation βP14500 in IIL technology (rather than the original CMOS).

Notable uses 
One of the computers known to be based on this processor is the educational WDR 1-bit computer (512 bits of RAM, LED, I/O, keyboard).

See also 
 WDR paper computer
 WDR Computerclub
 NDR computer

References

Further reading 
   (also: US 05/761,738; DE2801853A1)

External links
 
 
 
 
 

Motorola microprocessors
Motorola microcontrollers